Malouf syndrome (also known as "congestive cardiomyopathy-hypergonadotropic hypogonadism syndrome") is a congenital disorder that causes one or more of the following symptoms: mental retardation, ovarian dysgenesis, congestive cardiomyopathy, broad nasal base, blepharoptosis, and bone abnormalities, and occasionally marfanoid habitus (tall stature with long and thin limbs, little subcutaneous fat, arachnodactyly, joint hyperextension, narrow face, small chin, large testes, and hypotonia).

This disease is named after J. Malouf, who performed a case study on a family with this disease in 1985. The study consisted of two sisters displaying the above symptoms. The parents of the sisters were first-degree cousins, suggesting the possibility of a genetic disorder. In 1992, a new case study of an 18-year-old female conducted by Narahara et al. resulted in similar findings as Malouf. Although the prevalence of Malouf syndrome is unknown, there are less than 20 affected families discussed in literature. While there is no specific cure for Malouf syndrome, symptoms can be treated. The treatment options individualized and should be determined by a doctor or specialist.

Signs and symptoms

The main symptoms of this disease are hypergonadotropic hypogonadism and cardiomyopathy, whose coexistence is extremely rare.

symptoms 
 hypergonadotropic hypogonadism
 cardiomyopathy
 dilated cardiomyopathy
 blepharoptosis
 broad nasal base
 mild intellectual deficit
 metabolic abnormalities
 thyroid hemiagenisis: a rare congenital abnormality of the thyroid gland characterized by the absence of one lobe 
 aged appearance of the feet
 mild skeletal abnormalities
 diabetes mellitus
 collagenoma
 ovarian dysgenesis (female)
 hypoplastic genitalia: underdeveloped genitalia
 undescended testis (males)
 micropenis (males)
 small testis (males)

Note: it is possible that males with Malouf syndrome display cardiomyopathy but not testicular dysgenesis

Genetics 
Malouf syndrome involves an autosomal dominant inheritance pattern. It is caused by a heterozygous missense mutation in the LMNA gene located on chromosome 1 (1q22). LMNA gene encodes for lamin A and lamin C. The lamin family of proteins are components of the nuclear lamina that consists of a protein network within the inner nuclear membrane that determine nuclear stability, chromatin structure and gene expression. Mutations in this gene can lead to several diseases besides Malouf syndrome, such as familial partial lipodystrophy, limb girdle muscular dystrophy, Hutchinson-Gilford progeria syndrome etc. Therefore, making it harder to distinguish whether a patient is displaying signs of Malouf syndrome or some other disease.

The most common heterozygous mutations found in the LMNA gene are a heterozygous de novo ala57-to-pro substitution (A57P) resulting from a 584G-C transversion in the LMNA gene and a de novo 176T-C transition in exon 1 leading to a leu59-to-arg (L59R) substitution.

Diagnosis
There is no set criteria used to diagnose Malouf syndrome. Signs and symptoms such as congestive or dilated cardiomyopathy, ovarian dysgenesis in females or primary testicular failure in males, mental retardation, broad nasal base, blepharoptosis, skin lesions, and skeletal abnormalities are used as a reference to diagnosis this rare disease, and genetic testing of the LMNA gene can serve as a way to confirm any diagnosis made.

Malouf syndrome was first diagnosed in 1985 by Dr. Joe Malouf. Dr. Malouf examined two sisters who exhibited congestive cardiomyopathy associated with ovarian dysgenesis, secondary hypergonadotropic hypogonadism, bilateral ptosis, and prominent nasal bones. Dr. Malouf noted that this disease may be familial as the two sisters were children of first degree cousins. In 1992, Kouji Narahara examined an 18-year-old girl who displayed the same symptoms seen by Dr. Malouf.

Diagnosis of this syndrome is sometimes conflicting as the symptoms displayed match that of other diseases such as  limb girdle muscular dystrophy, Hutchinson-Gilford progeria syndrome etc.

Management
Currently, there is no specific cure or treatment for Malouf syndrome. However, there are ways to manage the symptoms associated with the disease. In order to treat dilated cardiomyopathy, doctors normally use a combination of drugs. Depending on your symptoms, you might need two or more drugs. The following is a list of drugs that are used to treat dilated cardiomyopathy.

Drugs:

Angiotensin-converting enzyme (ACE) inhibitors- Type of medicine enlarges blood vessels and lowers blood pressure in order to improve an individual's blood flow. This type of medicine can cause dry cough, low blood pressure, low white blood cell count, and kidney or liver problems.

Angiotensin II receptor blockers (ARBs)- Alternative drug that can be used if a person cannot tolerate ACE inhibitors. This drug can cause diarrhea, muscle cramps, and dizziness.

Sacubitril/valsartan (Entresto)- Type of Drug that combines ARBs with another medicinal drug to help pump blood from your heart to the rest of your body. This drug is mainly for people with chronic heart failure.

Beta-blockers- This type of drug slows your heart rate and lowers you blood pressure. This medication may also prevent the harmful effects of stress hormones. Some of the side effects of this medication include dizziness and low blood pressure.

Diuretics- This type of drug removes excess fluid and salt from your body as well as your lungs

Digoxin(Lanoxin)- The purpose of this drug is to strengthen your heart muscle contractions and slow down your heartbeat. This drug can reduce heart failure symptoms and improve your ability to be more active

Ivabradine(Corlanor)- This drug restores your normal heartbeat by slowing down and regulating your heart rate

Blood-thinning medications (anticoagulants)- This type of drug helps in preventing blood clots but can cause bruising or bleeding

There are also therapeutic devices available, specifically with the use of devices, that can be implemented to help treat dilated cardiomyopathy

Therapeutic devices:

Biventricular pacemaker- This device sends out electrical signals in order to control contractions between the left and right ventricles

Implantable cardioverter-defibrillators (ICD)- This device monitors your heartbeat and sends electric shocks to control rapid and abnormal heartbeats. This device can also serve as a pacemaker.

Left ventricular assist devices (LVAD)- This device is attached to the heart and either the abdomen or chest in order to help the weakened heart pump blood.

Hypergonadotropic hypogonadism can be treated with hormone replacement therapy, which consists of taking medications containing the hormone that your body is lacking, such as testosterone, estrogen, and progesterone, or pituitary hormones to replace the ones that the body no longer produces. The medication can come in the form of pills, patches, gels, or even injections.

Epidemiology

The prevalence of Malouf Syndrome is unknown at the moment and has not been fully defined. About 20 families from around the world, whose members have cardiogential syndrome, have been found in literature. However, the prevalence of familial dilated cardiomyopathy ranges from 30 to 50% cases, with 40% having an identifiable genetic cause. Dilated cardiomyopathy was originally classified as a rare disease, but the possibility of a familiar substrate was ignored. Dilated cardiomyopathy was later found to be a major cause of heart failure, especially among young patients. Dilated cardiomyopathy began to be identified as a systemic condition rather than an isolated disease. Even despite these major efforts and contributions, the incidence and prevalence of dilated cardiomyopathy remain unknown.

References

External links 

Congenital disorders
Syndromes with intellectual disability
Syndromes affecting the heart
Syndromes affecting the endocrine system